A Medium Attachment Unit (MAU) is a transceiver which converts signals on an Ethernet cable to and from Attachment Unit Interface (AUI) signals.

On original 10BASE5 (Thick) Ethernet, the MAU was typically clamped to the Ethernet cable. With later standards it was generally integrated into the network interface controller and eventually the entire Ethernet controller was often integrated into a single integrated circuit ("chip") to reduce cost.

In most modern switched or hubbed Ethernet over twisted pair systems, neither the MAU nor the AUI interfaces exist (apart, perhaps as notional entities for the purposes of thinking about layering the interface), and the category 5 (CAT5) cable connects directly into an Ethernet socket on the host or router. For backwards compatibility with equipment which still has external AUI interfaces, MAUs are still available with 10BASE2 or 10BASE-T connections.

The following standard, Fast Ethernet introduces division onto Media Access Controller (MAC) and Physical Layer Interface (PHY) layers connected with Media Independent Interface (MII). Some early Fast Ethernet hardware had a physical external MII connectors, functionally similar to AUI connector. However, the tradition of using a separate low-level I/O device in networking has continued in fast optical fiber network interfaces, where the GBIC, XENPAK, XFP, and enhanced small form-factor pluggable (SFP+) pluggable transceiver modules using the XAUI interface play a similar role.

Objectives of MAU:
 Provide the physical means for communication between local network data link entities.
 It defines a physical interface that can be implemented independently among different manufacturers of hardware and achieve the intended level of compatibility when interconnected in a common local network.
 Provide a communication channel capable of high bandwidth and low bit error ratio performance.
 Provide for ease of installation and service.
 Provide for high network availability (ability of a station to gain access to the medium and enable the data link connection in a timely fashion).
 Enable relatively low-cost implementations.

MAU Characteristics:
 Enables coupling the Physical Layer Signalling (PLS) by way of the AUI to the explicit baseband coaxial transmission system.
 Supports message traffic at a data rate of 10, 100, or even 1000 Mbit/s.
 Provides for driving up to 500m of coaxial trunk cable without the use of a repeater.
 Permits the DTE to test the MAU and the medium itself.
 Supports system configurations using the CSMA/CD access mechanism defined with baseband signaling.
 Supports bus topology interconnection.

Services provided by MAU:
 Transmit.
 Receive.
 Collision detection and Loop-back functions direct transfer through the MAU.
 The Jabber detect.
 It removes equipment from the network whenever it continuously transmits for periods significantly longer than required for a maximum-length packet, indicating a possible problem with the NIC.
 Signal quality error test.
 The signal quality error test detects silent failures in the circuitry.
 Link integrity functions
 detects breaks in the wire pairs.
 Both Signal quality error test and Link integrity functions assist in fault isolation.

Two modes of operation:
 Normal mode:
 The MAU functions as a direct connection between the baseband medium and the DTE. Data output from the DTE is output to the coaxial trunk medium and all data on the coaxial trunk medium is input to the DTE. This mode is the "normal" mode of operation for the intended message traffic between stations.
 Monitor mode or Isolated mode:
 The MAU functions as a receive-only connection between the baseband medium and the DTE. Data output from the DTE is suppressed and only data on the coaxial trunk medium is input to the DTE. This mode is for observing  message traffic.

MAU functional specifications:
 Transmit function
 The ability to transmit serial data bit streams on the baseband medium from the local DTE entity and to one or more remote DTE entities on the same network.
 Receive function
 The ability to receive serial data bit streams over the baseband medium.
 Collision Presence function
 The ability to detect the presence of two or more stations concurrent transmissions.
 Monitor function (Optional)
 The ability to inhibit the normal transmit data stream to the medium at the same time the normal receive function and collision presence function remain operational.
 Jabber function
 The ability to automatically interrupt the transmit function and inhibit an abnormally long output data stream. It removes equipment from the network whenever it continuously transmits for periods significantly longer than required for a maximum-length packet, indicating a possible problem with the NIC.

MAU in this context is not to be confused with a Media Access Unit, which shares the same acronym.

References

Ethernet
Computer connectors